René Deffke (born 9 November 1966 in East Berlin) is a German football manager and former footballer.

He is currently the manager of BV Bad Lippspringe.

Career
Early in his career Deffke played one season in the East German Oberliga for 1. FC Union Berlin. After the German reunification he went on to play eight seasons in the 2. Bundesliga, before playing mostly in the third tier of German football until he retired from the game in 2000.

References

External links

1966 births
Living people
Association football forwards
East German footballers
German footballers
Footballers from Berlin
2. Bundesliga players
1. FC Union Berlin players
Hertha BSC players
Eintracht Braunschweig players
FC Carl Zeiss Jena players
SC Fortuna Köln players
Rot Weiss Ahlen players
VfL Wolfsburg players
SV Eintracht Trier 05 players
FSV Union Fürstenwalde players
People from East Berlin